Henry Watts may refer to:

 Henry Watts (botanist) (1828–1889), Australian amateur collector of algae specimens
 Henry Watts (chemist) (1815–1884), English chemist
 Henry Edward Watts (1826–1904), British journalist and author
 Henry M. Watts (1817–1894), American lawyer, politician, and diplomat

See also
 
 Henry Watt (disambiguation)
 Henry (given name)
 Watts (surname)